Shaman's Harvest is an American alternative metal band from Jefferson City, Missouri. Bassist Matt Fisher, singer Nathan "Drake" Hunt, and guitarist Josh Hamler founded the band in 1996. Ryan Tomlinson joined the band on lead guitar for their 2009 album Shine. Shaman's Harvest released their fifth full-length album titled Smokin' Hearts & Broken Guns on September 16, 2014. This release marked their debut on Mascot Records.

History
The band released three albums in their early years: Last Call for Goose Creek (1999), Synergy (2002), and March of the Bastards (2006). In 2009, the single "Dragonfly" from their fourth album, Shine, reached number 16 on Billboard's Active Rock chart, nine at Heritage Rock, and 34 on Billboards Rock Songs chart. The single sold over 130,000 copies and the album sold 33,000+ copies. The song appeared on the soundtrack of the motion picture Legendary.

In early 2010, Shaman's Harvest recorded "Broken Dreams" as the theme song for wrestler Drew McIntyre of the WWE. They continued that relationship, supplying "End of Days" as the entrance track for Wade Barrett and The Corre. They also created the promo song "And Then There Was Darkness" for Bray Wyatt and The Undertaker for their match at WrestleMania 31. Their song "Anger" appears in the feature film No One Lives.

During the recording of their album Smokin' Hearts & Broken Guns, Hunt was diagnosed with throat cancer and received treatment during the recording of the album. Lead guitarist Ryan Tomlinson left the group in September 2014 to concentrate on his band Driving Wheel. He was replaced by guitarist Derrick Shipp for the tour supporting Smokin' Hearts & Broken Guns. Joe Harrington joined on drums following the release of Smokin' Hearts & Broken Guns. He left in August 2015 and Jeff Nations (of JB Crockett; formerly of Rookie of the Year) filled in before Adam Zemanek joined on drums in October 2015. "In Chains", the final single off of "Guns", reached #12 on Billboard's Mainstream Rock chart and spent 22 weeks there, their highest peaking single, in addition to spending four months in the Top 10 of iTunes' Metal Songs chart.

In 2017, the band released their sixth studio album, Red Hands Black Deeds. Written during the 2016 presidential election, it represented a departure for the band in its thematical and lyrical content, discussing the political and economic struggles in the United States. The album appeared on four Billboard charts, including #1 on the Heatseekers Albums chart, the band's first to do so. To support the album, they opened for Nickelback on their "Feed the Machine" North American tour along with Daughtry.

On May 14, 2021, Shaman's Harvest released the track "Bird Dog." This was followed by the radio single "Voices" and its music video on September 10. On October 22, the band announced their latest studio album, Rebelator, which released on March 11, 2022. The album announcement coincided with the release of a third album track, "Under Your Skin." To support the album, the band toured with Theory Of A Deadman in early 2022.

Members
Nathan Hunt – lead vocals
Josh Hamler – rhythm guitar
Derrick Shipp – lead guitar
Adam Zemanek – drums
Cord Bishop - bass guitar

Former members
Matt Fisher – bass
Ryan Tomlinson – lead guitar 
Jay Pelzer – lead guitar
Adam Hunt – lead guitar
Ryan Turnbull – drums
Craig Wingate – drums
Lance Bennett – drums
Spencer Huff - drums
Joe Harrington – drums
Jeff Nations – drums (sub)

Discography

Studio albums

Singles

Music videos

References

External links
 Official website

American alternative metal musical groups
American post-grunge musical groups
Heavy metal musical groups from Missouri